David Trainer is an American television director. He is perhaps best known for directing every episode of the Fox sitcom That '70s Show (except the pilot, which was directed by Terry Hughes) and directed all the episodes of the Netflix sitcom The Ranch. He also directed the first two seasons of the television show Boy Meets World (also a supervising producer), the 4th and final season of the John Larroquette Show and over 60 episodes of Designing Women. Among many others, his directing credits also include several episodes of FM, Sabrina the Teenage Witch, Grace Under Fire, Cybill, Anything But Love, My Boys, Hot in Cleveland and Mike & Molly.

He also wrote episodes for the soap opera Ryan's Hope in 1977 and the sitcom Misery Loves Company which he co-created with Michael Jacobs and Bob Young in 1995.

Awards
Trainer was nominated for three Primetime Emmy Awards for his work on Designing Women from 1989 to 1991.

1989 - Outstanding Comedy Series - Designing Women - nominated
1990 - Outstanding Comedy Series - Designing Women - nominated
1991 - Outstanding Comedy Series - Designing Women - nominated

References

External links
 

American television directors
American television producers
American television writers
American male television writers
Living people
Place of birth missing (living people)
Year of birth missing (living people)